Lönsboda is the second largest locality in Osby Municipality, Scania County, Sweden with 1,903 inhabitants in 2010.

Lönsboda is situated in north-eastern Scania, about 20 km east of the municipal seat Osby and near the region border to Blekinge and Kronoberg.

The community grew up around a railway station which was opened in 1901.

United States Marine Corps War Memorial

Lönsboda has a connection to the United States and its military history.  Sculptors obtained a block of black diabase for the pedestal of the Marine Corps War Memorial from quarries in Lönsboda.

References 

Populated places in Skåne County
Populated places in Osby Municipality
United States Marine Corps memorials